The 1962 William & Mary Indians football team was an American football team that represented the College of William & Mary as a member of the Southern Conference (SoCon) during the 1962 NCAA University Division football season. In their sixth season under head coach Milt Drewer, William & Mary compiled a 4–5–1 record, with a mark of 4–3–1 in conference play, placing fourth in the SoCon.

Schedule

References

William and Mary
William & Mary Tribe football seasons
William